Rubus positivus is a rare North American species of brambles in the rose family. It has been found only in the State of Connecticut in the northeastern United States.

The genetics of Rubus is extremely complex, so that it is difficult to decide on which groups should be recognized as species. There are many rare species with limited ranges such as this. Further study is suggested to clarify the taxonomy.

References

positivus
Plants described in 1949
Flora of Connecticut
Flora without expected TNC conservation status